Sadick Adams (born 1 January 1990) is a Ghanaian professional footballer who last played as a striker for Bangladesh Premier League club Arambagh KS. Adams was considered by World Soccer magazine one of the 50 Most Exciting Teenagers on the Planet in their November 2007 issue.

Club career

Atlético Madrid
Atlético Madrid signed a pre-contract with Adams in November 2007, and allowed him to train with the reserve, as FIFA stated that no international transfer is allowed for player under-18.

FK Vojvodina
On 3 December 2009, it was announced that Adams would join Vojvodina. He was officially signed on 6 December 2009, on a four and a half year contract. He played half a season with the Serbian SuperLiga club, having played only 9 league matches.

Étoile Sportive du Sahel
On 16 May 2010, Adams returned to Africa and he signed a three-year contract with Tunisian Ligue Professionnelle 1 club Étoile Sportive du Sahel.

Al-Ansar
In January 2012, Adams signed with Saudi Professional League club Al-Ansar for the 2011–12 Saudi Professional League.

Berekum Chelsea
In October 2012, Adams signed a contract with Glo Premier League club Berekum Chelsea for the 2012–13 season. On 24 October 2012, Adams made his debut for Berekum Chelsea in a 1–0 defeat to Medeama SC.

Saham
In the summer of 2013, Sadick Adams joined Saham of Oman.

He then played with Turkish Cypriot club Türk Ocağı.

Asante Kotoko
Sadick Adams was signed by Asante kotoko and was handed number 99. He scored a lot of match winning goals in his first season. Mostly through penalty kicks. But what most Kumasi Asante Kotoko fans will remember him for is his first half hat trick against rivals Accra Hearts of Oak (during the 2017 MTN FA cup in Tamale which Asante Kotoko won by 3 goals to 1).

International career

2007 U-17 World Cup
He scored 4 goals in 2007 FIFA U-17 World Cup for the Ghana U17 team, including a goal in their 1–2 semi-final loss to Spain.

Ghana national under-23 team
During 2011, he was part of the Ghana national under-23 football team in the 2011 CAF U-23 Championship which was a qualifying tournament for the 2012 London Olympics.

Ghana national team
Adams debuted for the Ghanaian main national team in 2017.

International goals
Scores and results list Ghana's goal tally first.

References

External links
 
 
 
 

1990 births
Living people
Ghanaian footballers
Ghana international footballers
Association football forwards
Ashanti Gold SC players
FK Vojvodina players
Serbian SuperLiga players
Étoile Sportive du Sahel players
ES Hammam-Sousse players
Ghanaian expatriate footballers
Expatriate footballers in Spain
Expatriate footballers in Serbia
Expatriate footballers in Tunisia
Expatriate footballers in Saudi Arabia
Expatriate footballers in Oman
Expatriate footballers in Northern Cyprus
Expatriate footballers in Lebanon
Ghanaian expatriate sportspeople in Spain
Ghanaian expatriate sportspeople in Serbia
Ghanaian expatriate sportspeople in Tunisia
Ghanaian expatriate sportspeople in Saudi Arabia
Ghanaian expatriate sportspeople in Lebanon
Al-Ansar FC (Medina) players
Al-Nahda Club (Saudi Arabia) players
Al-Fayha FC players
Lebanese Premier League players
Shabab El Bourj SC players
Saudi First Division League players
Saudi Professional League players
People from Tamale, Ghana
Berekum Chelsea F.C. players